Heikki Hirvonen (8 February 1895 in Rääkkylä – 19 August 1973 in Rääkkylä) was a Finnish biathlete who competed in the 1924 Winter Olympics.

He was born in Rääkkylä and died in Riihimäki. In 1924 he was a member of the Finnish military patrol team which won the silver medal.

External links
 

1895 births
1973 deaths
People from Rääkkylä
Finnish military patrol (sport) runners
Olympic biathletes of Finland
Military patrol competitors at the 1924 Winter Olympics
Olympic silver medalists for Finland
Medalists at the 1924 Winter Olympics
Sportspeople from North Karelia